An Italian beef sandwich, originating in Chicago, is composed of thin slices of seasoned roast beef, simmered and served  on a long French roll. The sandwich's history dates back at least to the 1930s. The bread itself is, at the diner's preference, often dipped (or double-dipped) into the juice the meat is cooked in, and the sandwich is typically topped off with Chicago-style giardiniera (called "hot") or sauteed, with green Italian sweet peppers (called "sweet").

Italian beef sandwiches are commonly found at many area hot dog stands, pizzerias and Italian-American restaurants in the Chicago area. Chicago expatriates have opened restaurants serving Italian beef in other places. In the United States, demand for the sandwich spiked with the popularity of the television show The Bear, set in a fictional Chicago restaurant.

Preparation
Italian beef is made using cuts of beef from the sirloin rear or the top/bottom round wet-roasted in broth with garlic, oregano and spices until cooked throughout. The meat is roasted at ≤ ; this results in up to a 45% reduction in weight, but also yields the sandwich's famous ‘jus’ or gravy. The beef is then cooled, sliced thin using a deli slicer, and then reintroduced to its reheated beef broth. The beef then sits in the broth, typically for hours. The inefficiency of this process, however, has started to concern many larger Italian beef producers and retailers. In response, some attempt to achieve higher yields by lowering the cooking temperature and placing the beef into food-grade polyester and nylon cook bags, which changes the outer appearance of the beef. Though this reduced time is sufficient for cooking the beef all the way through, it does not allow the jus to be harvested fully. Because traditional Italian beefs are dipped in the jus from their own roast, when this more efficient method is used, the sandwich's potency is affected. Some companies add MSG, phosphates and other additives in attempts to reach for higher yields.

Origins
The exact origin is unknown, but it was likely created by Italian immigrants who may have worked in Chicago's Union Stock Yards. Families sliced inexpensive beef cuts exceedingly thin, both to stretch the meal among many mouths, and to tenderize cheaper cuts.  Similarly, extended soaking in seasoned broth tenderized the beef, softened and gave volume to hard or days-old bread, and flavored lean beef and old bread. 

According to Scala's Original Beef and Sausage Company (formed in 1925), this meal was originally introduced at weddings and banquets where the meat was sliced thinly so there would be enough to feed all the guests.  It rapidly grew in popularity and eventually became one of Chicago's most famous ethnic foods: the original Italian beef sandwich.

The recipe was popularized by Pasquale Scala, and a group of his associates who started small beef stands in Chicago and used similar recipes, perfecting Chicago's original Italian beef sandwich. Al Ferreri and his sister and brother-in-law, Frances and Chris (Baba) Pacelli, founded Al's Beef in 1938, and Mr. Beef on Orleans co-founders Carl Buonavolanto Jr. and Tony ("Uncle Junior" to the Buonavolantos) Ozzauto each set up shop.

Other Italian beef purveyors likewise set up shop in the '40s, many obtaining their beef from Scala Packing Company of Chicago.
Chris Pacelli (Baba) (founder of Al's Beef in 1938), Carl Bonavolanto Jr. and Tony Ozzauto (co-founders,  Mr. Beef on Orleans in 1961), were among the group.

By 1954, local restaurant Al's Beef was advertising its "Pizza, Spaghetti, Ravioli, (and) Italian Beef Sandwiches" in the Chicago Tribune.
 
Mr. Beef's founder helped his brother, Joe Buonavolanto, open one of the first Italian beef stands outside of the city limits.

Variations

There are varying degrees of juiciness, depending on taste. Nomenclature varies from stand to stand, but wet or dipped means the bread is quickly dunked in the juice; juicy even wetter; and soaked is dripping wet.

Most Chicago beef restaurants also offer a "combo," adding a grilled Italian sausage to the sandwich. Different eateries offer hot or mild sausage, or both.

Typical beef orders are:

 Hot dipped: Italian beef on gravy-wetted bread and giardiniera.
 Hot dipped combo: Italian beef and sausage on gravy-wetted bread with giardiniera.
 Sweet dry: Italian beef placed on dry bread, topped with sweet peppers.
 Gravy bread: meatless Italian bread soaked in the juice of Italian beef, often served with peppers or giardiniera.  Also known in some places as "Soakers" or "Juice-ons".
 Cheesy beef or cheef: Italian beef with cheese (Provolone, Mozzarella or, rarely, Cheddar); not all stands offer this.
 Cheesy beef on garlic: Italian beef with cheese (Provolone, Mozzarella or, rarely, Cheddar) and the bread being pre-cooked and seasoned like traditional garlic bread; not all stands offer this.

Some order the "triple double," which consists of double cheese, double sausage and double beef. Other even less common variations include substituting Italian bread with a large croissant or topping with marinara sauce.

Outside of Chicago

Among Sicilian-Americans in Brooklyn, New York, especially in Bensonhurst, the Italian beef sandwich is called a "roast beef hero". In 1968, The Original John's Deli opened on the corner of Stillwell Avenue and 86th Street by Sicilian immigrants John and Maria Cicero. There was now easy access to roast beef and therefore, they decided to use roast beef in their business, preparing roast beef heroes adding mozzarella, gravy and onions to the hero, becoming a Brooklyn staple and would eventually be renamed the "Johnny Roast Beef" after a character from the movie GoodFellas. Other places took note of this sandwich and added them to their menu or created their own variation to the sandwich including Roll N' Roaster, Brennan and Carr, and Defonte's.

In the media

The Italian beef sandwich was featured in a late 2008 episode of the Travel Channel's Man v. Food, when host Adam Richman (who focused his restaurant visits on Chicago in that episode) visited Al's No. 1 Italian Beef to try the signature sandwich.

The sandwich was mentioned in the 1999 History Channel documentary American Eats: History on a Bun as an example of the specialty sandwiches found in different cities in the United States.  Chris Pacelli, owner of Al's No. 1 Italian Beef, is shown demonstrating how to eat the sandwich with the "Italian stance."

Al's Beef was also featured on Adam Richman's Best Sandwich in America in 2012, where Richman declared the Italian beef sandwich the best sandwich in the Midwest.

See also

 Cheesesteak
 Chicago culture
 Chicago-style hot dog
 Chicago-style pizza
 French dip sandwich
 Sandwiches That You Will Like
 List of regional dishes of the United States
 List of American sandwiches
 List of sandwiches
 Meatball sandwich
 Steak sandwich

References

External links
 GreaseFreak's images of Chicago-style Italian beefs

American sandwiches
Cuisine of Chicago
Cuisine of the Midwestern United States
Italian-American culture in Chicago
Sicilian-American cuisine
Italian-American culture in New York City
Beef sandwiches
Hot sandwiches